Xiangyin County is a county in Hunan Province, China, it is under the administration of Yueyang City. Located on the southeastern shores of Lake Dongting, the Xiang River runs south to north through the middle lands of the county, the Zi River merges into Dongting in the westeastern margin. Xiangyin is bordered by Yueyang County, Yuanjiang City to the north, Heshan District of Yiyang to the west, Wangcheng District of Changsha to the south, Miluo City to the east.

Administrative divisions
After an adjustment of township-level administrative divisions of Xiangyin county on 20 November 2015, Xiangyin has four townships and 10 towns under its jurisdiction, they are:

4 townships
 Jinghe, Xiangyin
 Liutang
 Yanglinzhai
 Yuhua, Xiangyin

10 towns
 Dongtang()
 Helonghu
 Jinlong
 Lingbei, Xiangyin
 Nanhuzhou
 Santang, Xiangyin
 Wenxing
 Xiangbin
 Xinquan
 Zhangshu, Xiangyin County

Notable people
 Guo Songtao, chinese diplomat and statesman during the Qing dynasty.
 Zuo Zongtang, Qing dynasty statesman and military leader.
 Fan Xudong, famous chemist during the period of Republic of China.
 Zhong Zhihua, member of Chinese Academy of Engineering, former president of Tongji University, former president of Hunan University.
 Yang Mengfei member of Chinese Academy of Science.
 Hu Zhiying contemporary artist, educator and poet.
 Gan Lin, agronomist and director of the State Anti-Monopoly Bureau.

Climate

Gallery

References

www.xzqh.org 

 
County-level divisions of Hunan
Yueyang